Diana's Punchbowl, also called the Devil's Cauldron, is a geothermal feature located on a small fault in Nye County, Nevada. Hot water in the pool of the bowl is about 30 feet (9 m) below the rim.

Geography

Near the geographic center of Nevada, Diana's Punchbowl or the Devil's Cauldron, is formed in the geothermically active portion of the Great Basin. It is located in central-western Nevada, in the Monitor Valley, about 30 miles southeast of Austin, Nevada in Nye County. Diana's Punchbowl is just east of Monitor Valley Road about 9 miles south of Monitor Ranch. The bowl is at the top of a travertine hill.  It is 50 feet across and 30 feet deep.  The extreme water temperature of this feature is estimated to be . The hot mineral water flows into a hot creek allowing it to cool to approximately 100 °F at the far end of the creek. Several rock pools have been created along the creek.

References

Hot springs of Nevada
Bodies of water of Nye County, Nevada